Poecilasthena pulchraria is a moth of the family Geometridae. It is found in Australia and New Zealand. It was first described by Edward Doubleday in 1843 and named Acidalia pulchraria.

The green looping caterpillars feed on the flowers, developing fruits and older foliage of Astroloma species in Australia and on Leucopogon fasciculatus in New Zealand.

References

External links
Australian Faunal Directory

Moths of Australia
Moths described in 1898
Poecilasthena
Moths of New Zealand